The discography of American rock band Cheap Trick includes 20 studio albums, 8 live albums, 17 compilation albums, 4 extended plays, and 65 singles.

Albums

Studio albums

Live albums

Compilation albums
 1991: The Greatest Hits (Platinum) (US #174)
 1992: Voices (Int'l Marketing Grp) 
 1993: Star Box (Sony Records Japan)
 1996: Sex, America, Cheap Trick
 1996: I Want You to Want Me (IMG Records)
 1998: Hits of Cheap Trick (import)
 1998: Don't Be Cruel (Collectables label)
 2000: Authorized Greatest Hits
 2004: The Essential Cheap Trick
 2005: Collection (Cheap Trick/In Color/Heaven Tonight)
 2005: Cheap Trick Rock on Break Out Years: 1979 (Madacy Records)
 2007: Super Hits (Sony Musical Special Products) 
 2007: Discover Cheap Trick (Epic/Legacy Records)
 2009: Playlist: The Very Best of Cheap Trick (Epic/Legacy Records)
 2014: The 70's (Sony Music Commercial Music Group)
 2015: The Epic Archive, Vol. 1 (1975–1979) (Epic/Legacy)
 2015: The Epic Archive, Vol. 2 (1980–1983) (Epic/Legacy) (US Independent Album Charts #49)
 2015: The Epic Archive, Vol. 3 (1984–1992) (Epic/Legacy) (US Independent Album Charts #37)
 2018: Greatest Hits - Japanese Single Collection (Sony Music Japan International)(Japan Oricon Charts #38)

EPs

Studio

Live

Compilation

Singles

Other appearances

Videography
 (1990) Every Trick in the Book
 (1997) Live from Australia
 (2001) Silver
 (2002) Music for Hangovers
 (2004) From Tokyo to You
 (2008) BUDOKAN!
 (2009) Sgt. Pepper Live

Notes

References

Cheap Trick
Discographies of American artists
Rock music group discographies